Elizabeth Refuses is a 1957 Australian TV play based on the 1813 novel Pride and Prejudice by Jane Austen. It was directed by William Sterling. It was performed live from Sydney on 5 February 1957.

The adaptation was written by English writer Margaret Macnamara of a   number of scenes from Jane Austen's novel. It ran for 30 minutes on the ABC.

Plot
In the Bennet house, Mrs Bennet wishes for her two sisters, Elizabeth and Jane, to be married. Mr Collins, a clergyman, arrives seeking a bride. Lady Catherine de Bourgh hints at future happiness for Elizabeth.  Elizabeth rejects Mr Collins' proposal.

Cast
Joan Lord as Elizabeth
Norman Cull as Mr Collins
Catherine Neill as Lady de Bourgh
Betty Lucas as Jane
Ailsa Grahame as Mrs.   Bennet

Production
Thelma Afford did the costumes.

References

1950s Australian television plays
1957 television plays